Five Field Kono (오밭고누) is a Korean abstract strategy game. A player wins by moving all of their pieces into the starting locations of their opponent's pieces.

Rules
The players take turns moving one of their pieces one square diagonally. The first player to move all of their pieces to their opponent's starting squares wins.

See also 
 Gonu

Bibliography

External links
Five Field Kono applet
Five Field Kono at Zillions of Games
Android version of Five Field Kono (supports games with bots and via the Internet)

Abstract strategy games
Traditional board games
Korean games
Games played on Go boards